The Croatia women's national under-23 volleyball team represents Croatia in international women's volleyball competitions and friendly matches under the age 23 and it is ruled by the Croatian Volleyball Federation That is an affiliate of International Volleyball Federation FIVB and also a part of European Volleyball Confederation CEV.

Results

FIVB U23 World Championship

References

External links
Official website

National women's under-23 volleyball teams
under